The 1999 African U-17 Championship qualification was a men's under-17 football competition which decided the participating teams of the 1999 African U-17 Championship.

Qualification

Preliminary round
The first leg matches were played on either 18 or 19 July 1998. The second leg matches were played on either 1 or 2 August 1998. The winners advanced to the First Round.

|}

First round
The first leg matches were played on either the 20, 21, 22 or 23 November 1998. The second leg matches were played on either 4, 5 or 6 December 1998, except for the Libya vs Tunisia match, which was played on 18 December. The winners advanced to the Second Round.
 

|}

Second round
The matches were played on different dates from 6 February to 21 March. The winners advanced to the Finals.

|}

Qualified teams

 
 (host nation)

Notes and references

External links
 African U-17 Championship 1999 - rsssf.org

Under-17 Championship Qualification, 1999
1999